Darwinia diosmoides is a species of flowering plant in the myrtle family Myrtaceae and is endemic to the south-west of Western Australia. It is a dense, erect shrub with linear leaves and more or less spherical heads of white flowers.

Description
The flowers are arranged in compact, more or less spherical heads  in diameter, with oblong bracteoles shorter than the sepals.

Taxonomy 
This species was formally described in 1828 by Swiss botanist Augustin Pyramus de Candolle who gave it the name Genetyllis diosmoides in his Prodromus Systematis Naturalis Regni Vegetabilis. In 1865, George Bentham changed the name to Darwinia diosmoides in the Journal of the Linnean Society, Botany. The specific epithet (diosmoides) means "Diosma-like".

Distribution and habitat
Darwinia diosmoides grows on granite outcrops, on hillsides, near salt lakes and on sand dunes in the Avon Wheatbelt, Esperance Plains, Jarrah Forest, Mallee and Warren bioregions of south-western Western Australia.

Conservation status
This darwinia is listed as "not threatened" by the Western Australian Government Department of Biodiversity, Conservation and Attractions.

References

diosmoides
Endemic flora of Western Australia
Myrtales of Australia
Rosids of Western Australia
Taxa named by Augustin Pyramus de Candolle
Plants described in 1828